Matías Silva (born 31 March 1984) is a retired Peruvian tennis player.

Silva has a career high ATP singles ranking of 643 achieved on 5 November 2007. He also has a career high doubles ranking of 529 achieved on 28 July 2008.

He has been a member of the Peru Davis Cup team from 2004 until 2008, competing in the World Group first round tie in 2008 against Spain.

ATP Challenger and ITF Futures finals

Singles: 2 (1–1)

Doubles: 7 (4–3)

References

External links
 
 
 

1984 births
Living people
Peruvian male tennis players
Sportspeople from Lima
20th-century Peruvian people
21st-century Peruvian people